West Vista is a twin towers skyscraper in Cengkareng, Jakarta, Indonesia. 
The 48 floors residential twin towers is part of an 8 hectares complex, of which 3 hectares are occupied by this building of 2855 apartment units. Singapore-based Keppel Land Limited is the developer of the complex. It was certified by the Green Mark Gold Building and Construction Authority of Singapore (BCA) in February 2017 to acknowledge environmentally friendly architectural and construction standards. The towers were topped off in May 2017.

See also

 List of tallest buildings in Indonesia
 List of tallest buildings in Jakarta

References

External links
 Official website

Buildings and structures in Jakarta
Skyscrapers in Indonesia
Residential skyscrapers in Indonesia